Teodor Wieliszek (2 November 1898 – 26 August 1952) was a Polish footballer. He played in one match for the Poland national football team in 1926.

References

External links
 

1898 births
1952 deaths
Polish footballers
Poland international footballers
Place of birth missing
Association footballers not categorized by position